Consumer News and Business Channel Africa (known as CNBC Africa) is an African pay television network launched on 1 June 2007. Founded by Rakesh Wahi and Zafar Siddiqi, the network is produced under license from CNBC International and is owned by Africa Business News. It is headquartered in Sandton, Johannesburg.

The channel features programmes and updates from CNBC Europe, the Middle East, India, Pakistan, the US and other CNBC affiliates around the world.

Bureaus
Bureaus for CNBC Africa are located in:

The channel produces 7 hours of local programming per business day. Local content is generated in the studios in Sandton, Johannesburg.

The Arabic Business Programmes Show for:
Cairo
Casablanca
Khartoum

Shows

Regular expert contributors
Bruce Whitfield
Paul Theron

Awards 
2009: CNBC Africa received the Best Television Feature 2009 for the programme "Doing Business in Africa" at the Diageo Africa Business Reporting Awards.
2009: CNBC Africa producer and reporter, Talia Sanhewe, was the winner of the Vodacom Journalist of the Year 2009 Western Region Television News Category.
2010: CNBC Africa won the Banking Reporting Category of the Africa investor Financial Reporting Awards 2010. The channel was nominated in both the 'Ai Financial News Reporting - Banking' and 'Ai Financial News Reporting - Resources (Mining, Energy, Oil & Gas)' categories.
2010: CNBC Africa received the Broadcast Award at the Sanlam Awards for Excellence in Financial Journalism 2010
2010: Producer Natascha Jacobsz-Botha was the winner of the Citadel ‘Words on Money’ Journalism Awards ‘Newcomer of the Year 2010’.
2010: CNBC Africa was nominated for 'Best Infrastructure Feature' and 'Best Tourism Feature' at the Diageo Africa Business Reporting Awards 2010.

References

External links
 

 
CNBC global channels
Television stations in South Africa
English-language television stations in South Africa
Television channels and stations established in 2007
Mass media in Johannesburg